The 1985 Gael Linn Cup, the most important representative competition for elite level participants in the women's team field sport of camogie, was won by Leinster, who defeated Connacht in the final, played at Páirc Uí Chaoimh.

Arrangements
Leinster defeated Ulster 5–10 to 0–1 in the semi-final and Munster by 4–9 to 1–6 in the final at Cork.

Gael Linn Trophy
In the trophy Munster defeated Connacht 1–10 to 1–7 victory over Connacht in the semi-final and defeated Ulster in the final 1–7 to 2–3 after a second-half comeback.

Final stages

Junior Final

References

External links
 Camogie Association

1985 in camogie
1985
Cam